The Wedding Singer is a 1998 American romantic comedy film directed by Frank Coraci, written by Tim Herlihy, and produced by Robert Simonds and Jack Giarraputo. The film stars Adam Sandler, Drew Barrymore, and Christine Taylor, and tells the story of a wedding singer in 1985 who falls in love with a waitress. The film was released on February 13, 1998. Produced on a budget of million, it grossed $123million worldwide and received generally positive reviews from critics. It is often ranked as one of Sandler's best comedies.

The film was later adapted into a stage musical of the same name, debuting on Broadway in April 2006 and closing on New Year's Eve of that same year. Jon Lovitz would reprise his role as Jimmie Moore in the episode of the same name of The Goldbergs, set during the events of The Wedding Singer, with Sandler,  Barrymore and Billy Idol appearing through the use of archival footage.

Plot
Robbie Hart is a wedding singer in Ridgefield, New Jersey in 1985, whose own wedding to his fiancée Linda is approaching. He meets and befriends Julia Sullivan, a new waitress at the reception hall where he works, and promises to sing at her wedding, though her fiancé, businessman and bond investor Glenn Gulia, has yet to set a date.

On Robbie's wedding day, his sister Kate informs him as he waits at the altar that Linda has changed her mind about the wedding, leaving him humiliated and emotionally devastated. Later that day, Linda visits Robbie and reveals that she fell in love with him for his ambitions of being a rock star, and hates the idea of being married to just a wedding singer. Robbie sinks into depression, causing his friends and family to be concerned. His best friend Sammy convinces him to return to work, but he gives a depressed performance that is panned, and decides to give up wedding gigs and reneges on his promise to sing for Julia when Glenn finally sets a date. However, Julia convinces him to help her with the planning and their friendship blossoms. During a double date with Julia, Glenn, and Julia's cousin Holly, Robbie learns from Glenn that he cheats on Julia frequently and plans to continue after they are married.

Julia and Robbie are increasingly confused by their deepening feelings for each other. When Holly tells Robbie that Julia is marrying Glenn for his money, he unsuccessfully pursues a job at a bank. Julia is dismayed at his materialism, and when he accuses her of the same, she becomes angry with him. Depressed, he decides to follow Sammy's example of only having shallow relationships with women, in response to which Sammy confides that he is unhappy, and encourages Robbie to tell Julia how he feels. Meanwhile, Julia confides in her mother that she has fallen out of love with Glenn and has developed feelings for Robbie, and bursts into tears thinking about becoming "Mrs. Julia Gulia". Robbie arrives to declare his feelings, and sees her through her bedroom window in her wedding dress, where she is happily looking in a mirror pretending she has just married Robbie, but Robbie assumes she is thinking of Glenn.

Heartbroken, Robbie leaves to get drunk and finds Glenn in the midst of his pre-wedding bachelor party, arm in arm with another woman. After a heated exchange, Glenn punches Robbie and mocks him. Robbie stumbles home to find Linda waiting for him wanting to reconcile, and passes out. The following morning, she answers the door and introduces herself as his fiancée to a crestfallen Julia. She runs to Glenn, who is sleeping off the events of the previous night, and tells him she wants to be married immediately. He half-heartedly offers to take her to Las Vegas.

Robbie awakens and, after shaking off his hangover from the previous night, rejects Linda's reconciliation, having realized how shallow she is during his time with Julia, and kicks her out. At the 50th wedding anniversary party of his neighbor Rosie, to whom he has been giving singing lessons, he realizes he wants to grow old with Julia and, with Rosie's encouragement, he decides to pursue her. Just then, Holly arrives and informs him of Julia's encounter with Linda, so Robbie rushes to the airport and gets a first class ticket to Las Vegas.

After telling his story to his empathetic fellow passengers, which include Billy Idol, he learns that Glenn and Julia are on the same flight. With the help of Billy and the flight crew, over the loudspeaker, he sings a song he has written called "Grow Old With You", dedicated to Julia. As Robbie enters the main cabin singing, Glenn tries to assault him only to be thwarted and shoved into a lavatory by the flight attendants with assistance from Billy and a large fan. Robbie and Julia admit their love for each other, and share a kiss. Billy, impressed by Robbie's song, offers to tell his record company executives about him. Later, Robbie and Julia are married, and Robbie's bandmates perform at their wedding.

Cast

 Adam Sandler as Robbie Hart, a wedding singer
 Drew Barrymore as Julia Sullivan, a waitress and later Robbie's love interest
 Christine Taylor as Holly Sullivan, Julia's cousin
 Allen Covert as Sammy, Robbie's best friend
 Angela Featherstone as Linda, Robbie's fiancée
 Matthew Glave as Glenn Gulia, a businessman and bond investor who is Julia's fiancé
 Alexis Arquette as George Stitzer, keyboardist and singer in Robbie's band
 Frank Sivero as Andy, Kate's husband and Tyler's and Petey's dad as well as Robbie's brother-in-law
 Christina Pickles as Angie Sullivan
 Ellen Albertini Dow as Rosie
 Jodi Thelen as Kate Hart, Robbie's sister and Andy's wife as well as Tyler's and Petey's mom
 Patrick McTavish as Tyler, Andy's and Kate's son and Petey's brother as well as Robbie's nephew
 Gemini Barnett as Petey, Andy's and Kate's son and Tyler's brother as well as Robbie's nephew
 Teddy Castellucci, Randy Razz, and John Vana as the remaining members of Robbie's band
 Billy Idol as himself 
 Kevin Nealon as Mr. Simms
 Marnie Schneider as Joyce, Flight Attendant
 Carmen Filpi as Old Man in Bar
 Robert Smigel as Andre
 Todd Hurst as Drunk Teenager
 Peter Dante as David's friend Jack Nisbet
Other notable appearances include future-Queens of the Stone Age musician Michael Shuman as The Bar Mitzvah boy, screenwriter Steven Brill as Glenn's buddy, the film's own writer Timothy P. Herlihy as Rudy, a Bartender, and Al Burke played the Large Billy Idol Fan. Also appearing uncredited were Steve Buscemi as David Veltri, Jon Lovitz as Jimmie Moore, and Brian Posehn as Man at Dining Table #9. and Chauntal Lewis as Stuck-Up girl at Bar Mitzvah.

Production 
Adam Sandler had an idea for a comedy about a wedding singer who gets left at the altar, and suggested it to Tim Herlihy. Inspired by the radio show "Lost in the '80s" Herlihy decided to set the film in that decade. Herlihy had not set out to do anything different and thought the script was similar to his previous collaborations with Sandler. The changes came naturally, and he attributed the differences to his recently having gotten married, as well as the chemistry between Sandler and Barrymore. Herlihy was aware that Sandler's previous films had lacked a female perspective, and emphasized the importance of Barrymore. He explained that she was so great in her scenes that test audiences did not complain about Sandler not being in every scene as they had done for his previous films, and as a result more of her scenes survived and were included in the final film. Carrie Fisher, a frequent script doctor, was brought on to make the female part more balanced. Judd Apatow and Sandler also performed uncredited rewrites of the script.

Director Frank Coraci was friends with Sandler since they went to college at NYU and could hardly believe that he and his friends had the opportunity to make films together. Coraci had also gotten over his own experiences of romantic heartbreak a few years earlier and was able to look back on it differently and instead allow it to be funny. Coraci was a fan of director John Hughes and mentioned his films as an important influence.

Barrymore approached Sandler about working together on a film, saying they were "cinematic soulmates" before they had even worked together. Barrymore had a great relationship with Coraci, and praised him for balancing the broad comedy with the important moments of emotion and intimacy. Sandler would often make Barrymore laugh out of context, so that even after a long day, her laughs on camera would be real. In addition, she would not read or hear the songs until the first shoot so that her reactions would be more spontaneous.

Principal photography took place in California from February 3 to March 25, 1997.

Reception

Box office 

The film had a budget of $18million and made $123.3 million worldwide in ticket sales. It opened in second in the US with $18.8 million, behind holdover Titanic.

Critical response

On Rotten Tomatoes the film holds an approval rating of 72% based on 67 reviews, with an average rating of 6.3/10. The website's critics consensus reads, "It's decidedly uneven -- and surprisingly sappy for an early Adam Sandler comedy -- but The Wedding Singer is also sweet, funny, and beguiling." On Metacritic, it has a weighted average score of 59 out of 100 based on 21 critics, indicating "mixed or average reviews". Audiences surveyed by CinemaScore gave the film an average grade of "A−" on an A+ to F scale.

Leonard Klady of Variety wrote: "Director Frank Coraci and scripter Tim Herlihy work in concert to maintain a quality of farce rooted in human comedy." Roger Ebert gave the film a negative review and wrote: "The screenplay reads like a collaboration between Jekyll and Hyde."

Boy George responded to the film, saying that when he saw Alexis Arquette doing an impersonation of him and singing "Do You Really Want to Hurt Me" he thought it was hilarious.

The film has frequently been ranked as one of Sandler's best comedies.

Soundtrack
Two soundtrack albums for the film, called The Wedding Singer and The Wedding Singer Volume 2, were released in 1998. While the film had the actors performing many of the songs, the soundtrack albums, for the most part, contained the original versions of the songs instead, as well as the songs that were in the background during the film and original songs and dialogue from it. Only for "Rapper's Delight" was its rendition (by Ellen Dow) used, in combination with the original recording.

The track listing of the first album is:
 "Video Killed the Radio Star" (originally performed by The Buggles), performed by The Presidents of the United States of America
 "Do You Really Want to Hurt Me", performed by Culture Club
 "Every Little Thing She Does Is Magic", performed by The Police
 "How Soon Is Now?", performed by The Smiths
 "Love My Way", performed by The Psychedelic Furs
 "Hold Me Now", performed by Thompson Twins
 "Everyday I Write the Book", performed by Elvis Costello
 "White Wedding", performed by Billy Idol
 "China Girl", (Originally performed by Iggy Pop), performed by David Bowie
 "Blue Monday", performed by New Order
 "Pass the Dutchie", performed by Musical Youth
 "Have You Written Anything Lately?"
 "Somebody Kill Me", written by Adam Sandler and Tim Herlihy, performed by Adam Sandler
 "Rapper's Delight" (medley), performed by Sugarhill Gang and Ellen Dow

The track listing of the second album is:
 "Too Shy", performed by Kajagoogoo
 "It's All I Can Do", performed by The Cars
 "True", performed by Spandau Ballet
 "Space Age Love Song", performed by A Flock of Seagulls
 "Private Idaho", performed by The B-52's
 "Money (That's What I Want)", performed by Flying Lizards
 "You Spin Me Round (Like a Record)", performed by Dead or Alive
 "Just Can't Get Enough", performed by Depeche Mode
 "Love Stinks", performed by The J. Geils Band
 "You Make My Dreams", performed by Hall & Oates
 "Holiday", performed by Madonna
 "Grow Old With You", written by Adam Sandler and Tim Herlihy, performed by Adam Sandler

Songs and renditions that appeared in the movie, but were not included in the soundtrack albums, were:
 "Der Kommissar", performed by After the Fire
 "99 Luftballons", performed by Nena
 "Till There Was You", written by Meredith Willson, performed by Ellen Dow
 "Don't Stop Believin'" (originally performed by Journey)
 "Boys Don't Cry", performed by The Cure
 "All Night Long (All Night)", performed by Lionel Richie
 "That's All", written by Alan Brandt & Bob Haymes, performed by Adam Sandler
 "Ladies' Night" (originally performed by Kool & the Gang), performed by Jon Lovitz
 "Do You Believe in Love", performed by Huey Lewis and the News
 "Jam on It", Newcleus
 "Miami Vice Theme", performed by Jan Hammer
 "Hungry Heart", performed by Bruce Springsteen
 "The Goofball Brothers Show", written and performed by Sourcerer
 "Wake Me Up Before You Go-Go", performed by Wham!

Musical adaptation 

In 2006, a musical adaption of the same name was released on Broadway starring Stephen Lynch as Robbie and Laura Benanti as Julia. The show has had two national tours in 2007-2008 and 2009-2010 respectively. It was nominated for five Tony Awards and eight Drama Desk Awards and received generally good reviews. In this show, the airplane scene with Billy Idol was replaced with a scene in Las Vegas where Robbie meets a Billy Idol impersonator, and they and a group of other impersonators including Ronald Reagan, Cyndi Lauper and Imelda Marcos come to convince Julia to give up Glenn. In addition, Robbie's neighbor Rosie is changed to be his grandma with whom he lives and who asks him to write a song out of a poem she wrote for the 50th anniversary party. Also Robbie's friend, Sammy, was changed from being a limousine driver to being a part of Robbie's band. The show only ran on Broadway for 284 performances but has become a popular show among community theaters and high schools.

References

External links

 
 
 
 
 
 

1998 films
1998 romantic comedy films
1990s American films
1990s English-language films
American romantic comedy films
Films about singers
Films about weddings in the United States
Films directed by Frank Coraci
Films produced by Robert Simonds
Films scored by Teddy Castellucci
Films set in 1985
Films set in New Jersey
Films with screenplays by Tim Herlihy
New Line Cinema films